St. Sebastian's Higher Secondary School is a Christian minority institution located in Koodaranji, Kozhikode, in the Diocese of Thamarassery. It was established in 1948 by Fr. Bernadine as St. Sebastian's Elementary School, under the Government of Madras. K. O. Paulose was the first principal. The school got recognition from Government of Kerala in 1962 when Fr. Bartholomew was the school manager. It secured High school status in 1964 and Higher Secondary status in 1998. As of 2009, there are 68 teaching staff, 9 non-teaching staff and 1708 students in the institution.

References

Christian schools in Kerala
Primary schools in Kerala
High schools and secondary schools in Kerala
Schools in Kozhikode district
Educational institutions established in 1948
1948 establishments in India